Krawczyński (masculine), Krawczyńska (feminine) is a Polish-language surname. Russian form: Kravchinsky, Uktrainian: Kravchynskyi.

Notable people with the surname include:

 (born 1992), Polish model , TV presenter , blogger and influencer
 (born 1955), Polish conductor, rector of the Academy of Music in Krakow
 (1884-1940), Polish physician and statesman, MP
Zev Krawczynski, birth name of Wolf Gold (1889-1956),  rabbi, Polish Jewish activist, and one of the signatories of the Israeli declaration of independence

Polish-language surnames